Kirmse is a surname of German origin. Notable people with the surname include:

Andrew Kirmse, American computer programmer
Fritz Kirmse (1912 - ?), German violinist
Marguerite Kirmse (1885 - 1954), British-American artist
Mike Kirmse (born 1972), American soccer player
Persis Kirmse (1884 - 1955), British artist and illustrator

German-language surnames